Legia Warszawa is a professional football club based in Warsaw, Poland.

Season review

Players

Current squad
The numbers are established according to the official website: legia.com
Last updated on 16 August 2014

Reserve team 
 Legia Warszawa Reserve Team

Transfers

Transfers in

Loans in

Transfers out

Loans out

Competitions

Friendlies

Polish Super Cup

Ekstraklasa

Polish Cup

Champions League

*Celtic to play at Murrayfield Stadium due to Commonwealth Games Opening Ceremony at Celtic Park
**Celtic was awarded a 3-0 walkover due to Legia fielding an ineligible player

Europa League

Group stage

Statistics

Appearances

Numbers in parentheses denote appearances as substitute.
Players with no appearances not included in the list.

Goalscorers
Includes all competitive matches. The list is sorted by shirt number when total goals are equal.

Assists
Includes all competitive matches. The list is sorted by shirt number when total assists are equal.

References

External links

Legia Warsaw seasons
Legia Warsaw